Le Combat des livres is an annual "battle of the books" competition organized and broadcast by Ici Radio-Canada Première in Canada. A French edition of the Canada Reads competition, the program was launched in 2004. It aired annually from 2004 to 2014, and was then discontinued until being revived in 2018.

Both the English and French programs sometimes, but not always, include one personality more commonly associated with the other language community, who champions a translated work. One advocate, Maureen McTeer, appeared on both programs in the same year, championing the same novel in both its original English and translated French editions. Several other novels have also been chosen for both programs, although their English and French versions were not chosen by the same advocate or in the same year; one novel to date, Lawrence Hill's The Book of Negroes (French title Aminata) has won both competitions.

In 2021, for the first time in the history of the series the network produced two separate editions, one devoted to adult literature and one devoted to youth literature. The adult literature debates remain between celebrity personalities, while the youth literature debates take place between francophone teenagers selected through a school competition.

2004
Radio-Canada, the French-language service of CBC, aired a French version of Canada Reads, entitled Le combat des livres ("Battle of the Books"), from March 29 to April 2, 2004. It was moderated by Marie-France Bazzo.

2005
The 2005 edition of Le Combat des livres aired from March 14 to March 18, 2005. It was moderated by Marie-France Bazzo.

2006
The 2006 edition of Le Combat des livres aired from January 30 to February 3. It was moderated by Marie-France Bazzo.

2007
The 2007 edition of Le Combat des livres aired from February 26 to March 2 and was moderated by Christiane Charette.

2008
The 2008 edition of Le Combat des livres aired from February 25 to February 29 and was once again chaired by Christiane Charette.

2009
The 2009 edition of Le Combat des livres aired from March 23 to 27, and was once again chaired by Christiane Charette.

2010
The 2010 edition of Le Combat des livres aired from March 22 to 26. Christiane Charette moderated.

2011
The 2011 edition of Le Combat des livres aired from March 14 to 18. Christiane Charette moderated.

2012
Beginning in 2012, the production and broadcast of Le Combat des livres was transferred from Charette's program to the network's new literature show Plus on est de fous, plus on lit!, hosted by Marie-Louise Arsenault.

2013
The 2013 edition of Le Combat des livres aired from March 18 to 22. Marie-Louise Arsenault moderated. It was an all star season featuring previous winners.

2014
The 2014 edition of Le Combat des livres aired from March 31 to April 3. Marie-Louise Arsenault moderated.

2018
The 2018 edition of Le Combat des livres, the first time the show has aired since 2014, ran from May 7 to 11, 2018. Marie-Louise Arsenault moderated. The books were selected to represent the regions of Canada, with one book representing each of Atlantic Canada, Quebec, Ontario, Western Canada and the Indigenous peoples of Canada.

2019
The 2019 edition of Le Combat des livres aired from May 6 to 10, 2019, with Marie-Louise Arsenault moderating. The books were selected on the same theme of regional representation as the 2018 edition, with one book selected to represent each of Canada's four major geographic regions and one book selected to represent indigenous literature.

2020

2021
In 2021, Ici Radio-Canada Première planned two separate editions of Le Combat des livres, one devoted to young adult literature, with the five selected books advocated by francophone teenagers, and another for adult literature. The teen competition was staged in March 2021, while the adult competition took place May 3 to 7.

Writer Simon Boulerice and actress Catherine Trudeau also participated in the youth debates as assistant moderators.

Combat des livres jeunesse

Combat national des livres
The adult literature competition was staged from May 3 to 7, 2021.

2022

Combat des livres jeunesse

Combat national des livres
The adult literature competition was staged from May 2 to 6, 2022.

References

French-language radio programs in Canada
2004 radio programme debuts
Ici Radio-Canada Première